Moon Lake is located by Bartletts Corner, New York. The outlet flows into Varoom Creek. Fish species present in the lake are largemouth bass, northern pike, yellow perch, tiger muskie, bluegill, and black crappie. There is a state owned carry down on Moon Lake Road.

References 

Lakes of Jefferson County, New York